The Insectarium is a museum about insects located in the Northeast part of Philadelphia, Pennsylvania. The museum opened in 1992 and features displays of many types of live insects, mounted specimens, exhibits and hands-on activities. Examples of the live insects (and other arthropods) include honeybees, tarantulas, cockroaches, scorpions, spiders, praying mantis, millipedes, beetles, water bugs, ants, and crickets. In 2017 the museum expanded and opened a 7,000-square-foot greenhouse for a year-round butterfly pavilion. Following a reported heist of rare live insects in 2018, the insectarium was the subject of a four part true crime documentary titled Bug Out that was released in 2022.

On March 13, 2023, the Insectarium filed for Chapter 11 bankruptcy.

References

External links
 Philadelphia Insectarium & Butterfly Pavilion - official website

Museums in Philadelphia
Companies that filed for Chapter 11 bankruptcy in 2023
Natural history museums in Pennsylvania
Insectariums
Insect museums
Holmesburg, Philadelphia
Zoos
Botanical gardens in Pennsylvania
Butterfly houses